The Space Race was a 20th-century competition between two Cold War rivals, the United States and the Soviet Union, to achieve superior spaceflight capability. It had its origins in the ballistic missile-based nuclear arms race between the two nations following World War II. The technological advantage demonstrated by spaceflight achievement was seen as necessary for national security, and became part of the symbolism and ideology of the time. The Space Race brought pioneering launches of artificial satellites, robotic space probes to the Moon, Venus, and Mars, and human spaceflight in low Earth orbit and ultimately to the Moon.

Public interest in space travel originated in the 1951 publication of a Soviet youth magazine and was promptly picked up by US magazines. The competition began on July 30, 1955 when the United States announced its intent to launch artificial satellites for the International Geophysical Year. Four days later, the Soviet Union responded by declaring they would also launch a satellite "in the near future". The launching of satellites was enabled by developments in ballistic missile capabilities since the end of World War II. The competition gained Western public attention with the "Sputnik crisis", when the USSR achieved the first successful satellite launch, Sputnik 1, on October 4, 1957. It gained momentum when the USSR sent the first human, Yuri Gagarin, into space with the orbital flight of Vostok 1 on April 12, 1961. These were followed by a string of other early firsts achieved by the Soviets over the next few years.

Gagarin's flight led US president John F. Kennedy to raise the stakes on May 25, 1961 by asking the US Congress to commit to the goal of "landing a man on the Moon and returning him safely to the Earth" before the end of the decade. Both countries began developing super heavy-lift launch vehicles, with the US successfully deploying the Saturn V, which was large enough to send a three-person orbiter and two-person lander to the Moon. Kennedy's Moon landing goal was achieved in July 1969, with the flight of Apollo 11, a singular achievement Americans believed overshadowed all Soviet achievements. However, such an opinion is generally contentious, with others attributing the first man in space as being a much larger achievement. The USSR pursued two crewed lunar programs, but did not succeed with their N1 rocket to launch and land on the Moon before the US, and eventually canceled it to concentrate on Salyut, the first space station programme, and the first time landings on Venus and on Mars. Meanwhile, the US landed five more Apollo crews on the Moon and continued exploration of other extraterrestrial bodies robotically.

A period of détente followed with the April 1972 agreement on a co-operative Apollo–Soyuz Test Project (ASTP), resulting in the July 1975 rendezvous in Earth orbit of a US astronaut crew with a Soviet cosmonaut crew and joint development of an international docking standard APAS-75. Being considered as the final act of the Space Race, the competition would only gradually be replaced with cooperation. The collapse of the Soviet Union eventually allowed the US and the newly founded Russian Federation to end their Cold War competition also in space, by agreeing in 1993 on the Shuttle–Mir and International Space Station programs.

Origins
Although Germans, Americans and Soviets experimented with small liquid-fuel rockets before World War II, launching satellites and humans into space required the development of larger ballistic missiles such as Wernher von Braun's Aggregat-4 (A-4), which became known as the Vergeltungswaffe 2 (V2) developed by Nazi Germany to bomb the Allies in the war. After the war, both the US and USSR acquired custody of German rocket development assets which they used to leverage the development of their own missiles.

Public interest in space flight was first aroused in October 1951 when the Soviet rocketry engineer Mikhail Tikhonravov published "Flight to the Moon" in the newspaper Pionerskaya pravda for young readers. He described a two-person interplanetary spaceship of the future and the industrial and technological processes required to create it. He ended the short article with a clear forecast of the future: "We do not have long to wait. We can assume that the bold dream of Konstantin Tsiolkovsky will be realized within the next 10 to 15 years." From March 1952 to April 1954, the US Collier's magazine reacted with a series of seven articles Man Will Conquer Space Soon! detailing Wernher von Braun's plans for manned spaceflight. In March 1955, Disneyland's animated episode Man in Space in the US television with an audience of about 40 million people eventually fired the public enthusiasm for space travel and raised government interest, both in the USA and USSR.

Missile race

Soon after the end of World War II, the two former allies became engaged in a state of political conflict and military tension known as the Cold War (1947–1991), which polarized Europe between the Soviet Union's satellite states (often referred to as the Eastern Bloc) and the states of the Western world allied with the U.S.

Soviet rocket development

The first Soviet development of artillery rockets was in 1921 when the Soviet military sanctioned the Gas Dynamics Laboratory, a small research laboratory to explore solid fuel rockets, led by Nikolai Tikhomirov, who had begun studying solid and liquid-fueled rockets in 1894, and obtained a patent in 1915 for "self-propelled aerial and water-surface mines. The first test-firing of a solid fuel rocket was carried out in 1928.

Further development was carried out in the 1930s by the Group for the Study of Reactive Motion (GIRD), where Soviet rocket pioneers Sergey Korolev, Friedrich Zander, Mikhail Tikhonravov and Leonid Dushkin launched GIRD-X, the first Soviet liquid-fueled rocket in 1933. In 1933  the two design bureaus were combined into the Reactive Scientific Research Institute and produced the 
RP-318, the USSR's first rocket-powered aircraft and the RS-82 and RS-132 missiles, which became the basis for the Katyusha multiple rocket launcher, During the 1930s Soviet rocket technology was comparable to Germany's, but Joseph Stalin's Great Purge from 1936 to 1938 severely damaged its progress.

In 1944 the Soviets became aware of Nazi Germany's rocket program from Winston Churchill, which resulted in recovery of V-2 rocket parts from a missile test station in Debica, Poland. In early 1945 a team of Soviet rocket specialists were sent to Germany to identify and recover German rocket technology, which developed into Institute Rabe, a Soviet missile research group in Bleicherode, Germany that recruited and employed German rocket specialists to aid in current and future Soviet rocket development. In 1946 Operation Osoaviakhim moved more than 170 of the top German rocket specialists to the Soviet Union. In 1945 and 1946 the use of German expertise was invaluable in reducing the time needed to master the intricacies of the V-2 rocket, establishing production of the R-1 rocket and enable a base for further developments. However, after 1947 the Soviets made very little use of German specialists and their influence on the future Soviet rocket program was marginal. The Germans were eventually repatriated in 1951-53.

Having suffered at least 27 million casualties during World War II after being invaded by Nazi Germany in 1941, the Soviet Union was wary of the United States, which until late 1949 was the sole possessor of atomic weapons. Since the Americans had a much larger air force than the Soviet Union, and the United States maintained advance air bases near Soviet territory, in 1947 Stalin ordered the development of intercontinental ballistic missiles (ICBMs) in order to counter the perceived American threat. In 1953, Korolev was given the go-ahead to develop the R-7 Semyorka rocket. It was successfully tested on August 21, 1957, and became the world's first fully operational ICBM the following month. It was later used to launch the first satellite into space, and derivatives launched all piloted Soviet spacecraft.

American rocket development

Although American rocket pioneer Robert H. Goddard developed, patented, and flew small liquid-propellant rockets as early as 1914, he became a recluse when his ideas were ridiculed by an editorial in The New York Times. This left the United States as the only one of the major three World War II powers not to have its own rocket program, until Von Braun and his engineers were expatriated from Nazi Germany in 1945. The US acquired a large number of V2 rockets and recruited von Braun and most of his engineering team in Operation Paperclip. The team was sent to the Army's White Sands Proving Ground in New Mexico, in 1945. They set about assembling the captured V2s and began a program of launching them and instructing American engineers in their operation. These tests led to the first photos of Earth from space, and the first two-stage rocket, the WAC Corporal-V2 combination, in 1949. The German rocket team was moved from Fort Bliss to the Army's new Redstone Arsenal, located in Huntsville, Alabama, in 1950. From here, von Braun and his team developed the Army's first operational medium-range ballistic missile, the Redstone rocket, derivatives of which launched both America's first satellite, and the first piloted Mercury space missions. It became the basis for both the Jupiter and Saturn family of rockets.

Each of the United States armed services had its own ICBM development program. The Air Force began ICBM research in 1945 with the MX-774. In 1950, von Braun began testing the Air Force PGM-11 Redstone rocket family at Cape Canaveral. By 1957, a descendant of the Air Force MX-774 received top-priority funding. and evolved into the Atlas-A, the first successful American ICBM. Its upgraded version, the Atlas-D, later served as a nuclear ICBM and as the orbital launch vehicle for Project Mercury and the remote-controlled Agena Target Vehicle used in Project Gemini.

First artificial satellites
In 1955, with both the United States and the Soviet Union building ballistic missiles that could be used to launch objects into space, the stage was set for nationalistic competition. On July 29, 1955, James C. Hagerty, President Dwight D. Eisenhower's press secretary, announced that the United States intended to launch "small Earth circling satellites" between July 1, 1957, and December 31, 1958, as part of the US contribution to the International Geophysical Year (IGY). On August 2, at the Sixth Congress of the International Astronautical Federation in Copenhagen, scientist Leonid I. Sedov told international reporters at the Soviet embassy of his country's intention to launch a satellite as well, in the "near future".

Soviet planning

On August 30, 1955, Korolev managed to get the Soviet Academy of Sciences to create a commission whose purpose was to beat the Americans into Earth orbit: this was the de facto start date for the Space Race. The Council of Ministers of the Soviet Union began a policy of treating development of its space program as top-secret. When the Sputnik project was first approved, one of the immediate courses of action the Politburo took was to consider what to announce to the world regarding their event. The Telegraph Agency of the Soviet Union (TASS) established precedents for all official announcements on the Soviet space program. The information eventually released did not offer details on who built and launched the satellite or why it was launched. However, the public release is illuminating in what it does reveal: "there is an abundance of arcane scientific and technical data... as if to overwhelm the reader with mathematics in the absence of even a picture of the object".

The Soviet space program's use of secrecy served as both a tool to prevent the leaking of classified information between countries, and also to create a mysterious barrier between the space program and the Soviet populace. The program's nature embodied ambiguous messages concerning its goals, successes, and values. The program itself was so secret that a regular Soviet citizen could never achieve a concrete image of it, but rather a superficial picture of its history, present activities, or future endeavors. Launchings were not announced until they took place. Cosmonaut names were not released until they flew. Mission details were sparse. Outside observers did not know the size or shape of their rockets or cabins or most of their spaceships, except for the first Sputniks, lunar probes, and Venus probe.

The Soviet military maintained control over the space program; Korolev's OKB-1 design bureau was subordinated under the Ministry of General Machine Building, tasked with the development of intercontinental ballistic missiles, and continued to give its assets random identifiers into the 1960s. They cloaked the program in a shroud of secrecy; public pronouncements were uniformly positive. As far as the public knew, the Soviet space program had never experienced failure. According to historian James Andrews, "With almost no exceptions, coverage of Soviet space exploits, especially in the case of human space missions, omitted reports of failure or trouble".

Dominic Phelan says in the book Cold War Space Sleuths (Springer-Praxis 2013): "The USSR was famously described by Winston Churchill as 'a riddle, wrapped in a mystery, inside an enigma' and nothing signified this more than the search for the truth behind its space program during the Cold War. Although the Space Race was literally played out above our heads, it was often obscured by a figurative 'space curtain' that took much effort to see through".

United States planning

Initially, President Eisenhower was worried that a satellite passing above a nation at over  might be seen as violating that nation's airspace. He was concerned that the Soviet Union would accuse the Americans of an illegal overflight, thereby scoring a propaganda victory at his expense. Eisenhower and his advisors were of the opinion that a nation's airspace sovereignty did not extend past the Kármán line, and they used the 1957–58 International Geophysical Year launches to establish this principle in international law. Eisenhower also feared that he might cause an international incident and be called a "warmonger" if he were to use military missiles as launchers. Therefore, he selected the untried Naval Research Laboratory's Vanguard rocket, which was a research-only rocket. This meant that von Braun's team was not allowed to put a satellite into orbit with their Jupiter-C rocket, because of its intended use as a future military vehicle. On September 20, 1956, von Braun and his team did launch a Jupiter-C that was capable of putting a satellite into orbit, but the launch was used only as a suborbital test of reentry vehicle technology.

Sputnik
Korolev received word about von Braun's 1956 Jupiter-C test and, mistakenly thinking it was a satellite mission that failed, expedited plans to get his own satellite in orbit. Since the R-7 was substantially more powerful than any of the US launch vehicles, he made sure to take full advantage of this capability by designing Object D as his primary satellite. It was given the designation 'D', to distinguish it from other R-7 payload designations 'A', 'B', 'V', and 'G' which were nuclear weapon payloads. However, things were not going along well with the design and manufacturing of the satellite, so in February 1957, Korolev sought and received permission from the Council of Ministers to build a Prosteishy Sputnik (PS-1), or simple satellite. The council also decreed that Object D be postponed until April 1958. The new Sputnik was a metallic sphere that would be a much lighter craft, weighing  and having a  diameter. The satellite would not contain the complex instrumentation that Object D had, but had two radio transmitters operating on different short wave radio frequencies, the ability to detect if a meteoroid were to penetrate its pressure hull, and the ability to detect the density of the Earth's thermosphere.

Korolev was buoyed by the first successful launches of the R-7 rocket in August and September, which paved the way for the launch of Sputnik. Word came that the US was planning to announce a major breakthrough at an International Geophysical Year conference at the National Academy of Sciences in Washington D.C., with a paper titled "Satellite Over the Planet", on October 6, 1957. Korolev anticipated that von Braun might launch a Jupiter-C with a satellite payload on or around October 4 or 5, in conjunction with the paper. He hastened the launch, moving it to October 4. The launch vehicle for PS-1 was a modified R-7 – vehicle 8K71PS number M1-PS – without much of the test equipment and radio gear that was present in the previous launches. It arrived at the Soviet missile base Tyura-Tam in September and was prepared for its mission at launch site number one. The first launch took place on Friday, October 4, 1957 at exactly 10:28:34 pm Moscow time, with the R-7 and the now named Sputnik 1 satellite lifting off the launch pad and placing the artificial "moon" into an orbit a few minutes later. This "fellow traveler," as the name is translated in English, was a small, beeping ball, less than two feet in diameter and weighing less than 200 pounds. But the celebrations were muted at the launch control center until the down-range far east tracking station at Kamchatka received the first distinctive beep ... beep ... beep sounds from Sputnik 1s radio transmitters, indicating that it was on its way to completing its first orbit. About 95 minutes after launch, the satellite flew over its launch site, and its radio signals were picked up by the engineers and military personnel at Tyura-Tam: that's when Korolev and his team celebrated the first successful artificial satellite placed into Earth-orbit.

US response

CIA assessment
At the latest the successful start of Sputnik 2 with its weight of more than 500 kg proved that the USSR had achieved a leading advantage in rocket technology. The dumbfounded CIA estimated the launch weight at 500 metric tons requiring an initial thrust of more than 1,000 ton and supposed the use of a three-stage rocket. In a secret report it concluded that ″the launching of two earth satellites must have been a stupendous scientific achievement. … Launching of these satellites does indicate, however, that the USSR has perfected an ICBM which they can put on any desired target with accuracy."
 In reality the launch weight of the Soviet rocket was 267 metric tons with an initial thrust of 410 tons with one and half stage. The CIA's misjudgement was caused by extrapolating the parameters of the US Atlas rocket developed at the same time (launch weight 82 tons, initial thrust 135 tones, maximum payload of 70 kg for low Earth orbit). In part, the favourable data of the Soviet launcher was based on concepts proposed by the German rocket scientists headed by Helmut Gröttrup on Gorodomlya Island, such as, among other things, the rigorous weight saving, the control of the residual fuel quantities and a reduced thrust to weight relation of 1.4 instead of usual factor 2. The CIA had heard about such details already in January 1954 when it interrogated Göttrup after his return from the USSR but did not take him seriously.

US reactions

The Soviet success raised a great deal of concern in the United States. For example, economist Bernard Baruch wrote in an open letter titled "The Lessons of Defeat" to the New York Herald Tribune: "While we devote our industrial and technological power to producing new model automobiles and more gadgets, the Soviet Union is conquering space. ... It is Russia, not the United States, who has had the imagination to hitch its wagon to the stars and the skill to reach for the moon and all but grasp it. America is worried. It should be."

Eisenhower ordered project Vanguard to move up its timetable and launch its satellite much sooner than originally planned. The December 6, 1957 Project Vanguard launch failure occurred at Cape Canaveral Air Force Station in Florida. It was a monumental failure, exploding a few seconds after launch, and it became an international joke. The satellite appeared in newspapers under the names Flopnik, Stayputnik, Kaputnik, and Dudnik. In the United Nations, the Soviet delegate offered the US representative aid "under the Soviet program of technical assistance to backwards nations." Only in the wake of this very public failure did von Braun's Redstone team get the go-ahead to launch their Jupiter-C rocket as soon as they could. In Britain, the US's Western Cold War ally, the reaction was mixed: some celebrated the fact that the Soviets had reached space first, while others feared the destructive potential that military uses of spacecraft might bring. The Daily Express predicted that the US would catch up to and pass the USSR in space; "never doubt for a moment that America would be successful".

On January 31, 1958, nearly four months after the launch of Sputnik 1, von Braun and the United States successfully launched its first satellite on a four-stage Juno I rocket derived from the US Army's Redstone missile, at Cape Canaveral. It carried a micrometeorite gauge and a Geiger-Müller tube. It passed in and out of the Earth-encompassing radiation belt with its  orbit, therefore saturating the tube's capacity and proving what Dr. James Van Allen, a space scientist at the University of Iowa, had theorized. The belt, named the Van Allen radiation belt, is a doughnut-shaped zone of high-level radiation intensity around the Earth above the magnetic equator. Van Allen was also the man who designed and built the satellite instrumentation of Explorer 1. The satellite measured three phenomena: cosmic ray and radiation levels, the temperature in the spacecraft, and the frequency of collisions with micrometeorites. The satellite had no memory for data storage, therefore it had to transmit continuously. In March 1958 a second satellite was sent into orbit with augmented cosmic ray instruments.

Creation of NASA

On April 2, 1958, President Eisenhower reacted to the Soviet space lead in launching the first satellite by recommending to the US Congress that a civilian agency be established to direct nonmilitary space activities. Congress, led by Senate Majority Leader Lyndon B. Johnson, responded by passing the National Aeronautics and Space Act, which Eisenhower signed into law on July 29, 1958. This law turned the National Advisory Committee on Aeronautics into the National Aeronautics and Space Administration (NASA). It also created a Civilian-Military Liaison Committee, appointed by the President, responsible for coordinating the nation's civilian and military space programs.

On October 21, 1959, Eisenhower approved the transfer of the Army's remaining space-related activities to NASA. On July 1, 1960, the Redstone Arsenal became NASA's George C. Marshall Space Flight Center, with von Braun as its first director. Development of the Saturn rocket family, which when mature gave the US parity with the Soviets in terms of lifting capability, was thus transferred to NASA.

Robotic lunar probes
In 1958, Korolev upgraded the R-7 to be able to launch a  payload to the Moon. The Luna program began with three failed secret 1958 attempts to launch Luna E-1-class impactor probes. The fourth attempt, Luna 1, launched successfully on January 2, 1959, but missed the Moon. The fifth attempt on June 18 also failed at launch. The  Luna 2 successfully impacted the Moon on September 14, 1959. The  Luna 3 successfully flew by the Moon and sent back pictures of its far side on October 7, 1959. In total, the Luna program landed one successful impactor out of six attempts; one flyby out of three attempts; two soft landers out of 13 attempts; six orbiters out of eight attempts; two lunar rovers out of three attempts; and three sample returns out of 11 attempts.

The US first embarked on the Pioneer program in 1958 by launching the first probe, albeit ending in failure. A subsequent probe named Pioneer 1 was launched with the intention of orbiting the Moon only to result in a partial mission success when it reached an apogee of 113,800 km before falling back to Earth. The missions of Pioneer 2 and Pioneer 3 failed whereas Pioneer 4 had one successful lunar flyby in March 1959.

The Ranger program was started in 1959 by NASA's Jet Propulsion Laboratory. The Block I Ranger 1 and Ranger 2 suffered Atlas-Agena launch failures in August and November 1961. The  Block II Ranger 3 launched successfully on January 26, 1962, but missed the Moon. The  Ranger 4 became the first US spacecraft to reach the Moon, but its solar panels and navigational system failed near the Moon and it impacted the far side without returning any scientific data. The first successful Ranger mission was the  Block III Ranger 7 which impacted on July 31, 1964. Ranger had three successful impactors out of nine attempts.

The Surveyor program had five successful soft landings out of seven attempts from 1966 to 1968. The Lunar Orbiter program had five successes out of five attempts in 1966–1967.

First mammals in space

The US and the USSR sent animals into space to determine the safety of the environment before sending the first humans. The USSR used dogs for this purpose, and the US used monkeys and apes. The first mammal in space was Albert II, a rhesus monkey launched by the US on a sub-orbital flight on June 14, 1949, who died on landing due to a parachute malfunction.

The USSR sent the dog Laika into orbit on Sputnik 2 on November 3, 1957 for an intended ten-day flight. They did not yet have the technology to return Laika safely to Earth, and the government reported Laika died when the oxygen ran out, but in October 2002 her true cause of death was reported as stress and overheating on the fourth orbit due to failure of the air conditioning system. At a Moscow press conference in 1998 Oleg Gazenko, a senior Soviet scientist involved in the project, stated "The more time passes, the more I'm sorry about it. We did not learn enough from the mission to justify the death of the dog...".

On August 19, 1960, the dogs Belka and Strelka were sent into orbit aboard Sputnik 5 and safely returned.

The Americans sent the chimpanzee Ham on a suborbital flight of the Mercury capsule on Mercury-Redstone 2 and recovered him safely on January 31, 1961.

The chimpanzee Enos was launched on Mercury-Atlas 5 on November 29, 1961 into what was supposed to be a three-orbit flight. However, the mission was aborted after two orbits due to capsule overheating, and a malfunctioning "avoidance conditioning" test subjecting him to 76 electrical shocks.

First humans in space

Vostok

The Soviets designed their first human space capsule using the same spacecraft bus as their Zenit spy satellite, forcing them to keep the details and true appearance secret until after the Vostok program was over. The "Vostok spaceship" was first displayed at the July 1961 Tushino air show, mounted on its launch vehicle's third stage, with the nose cone in place concealing the spherical capsule. A tail section with eight fins was added in an apparent attempt to confuse western observers. This also appeared on official commemorative stamps and a documentary. The Soviets finally revealed the true appearance of their Vostok capsule at the April 1965 Moscow Economic Exhibition.

On April 12, 1961, the USSR surprised the world by launching Yuri Gagarin into a single, 108-minute orbit around the Earth in a craft called Vostok 1. They dubbed Gagarin the first cosmonaut, roughly translated from Russian and Greek as "sailor of the universe". Gagarin's capsule was flown in automatic mode, since doctors did not know what would happen to a human in the weightlessness of space; but Gagarin was given an envelope containing the code that would unlock manual control in an emergency.

Gagarin became a national hero of the Soviet Union and the Eastern Bloc, and a worldwide celebrity. Moscow and other cities in the USSR held mass demonstrations, the scale of which was second only to the World War II Victory Parade of 1945. April 12 was declared Cosmonautics Day in the USSR, and is celebrated today in Russia as one of the official "Commemorative Dates of Russia." In 2011, it was declared the International Day of Human Space Flight by the United Nations.

The USSR demonstrated 24-hour launch pad turnaround and launched two piloted spacecraft, Vostok 3 and Vostok 4, in essentially identical orbits, on August 11 and 12, 1962. The Vostok had no maneuvering rockets to keep the two craft a controlled distance apart. Vostok 4 also set a record of nearly four days in space. The first woman, Valentina Tereshkova, was launched into space on Vostok 6 on June 16, 1963, as (possibly) a medical experiment. She was the only one to fly of a small group of female parachutist factory workers (unlike the male cosmonauts who were military test pilots), chosen by the head of cosmonaut training because he read a tabloid article about the "Mercury 13" group of women wanting to become astronauts, and got the mistaken idea that NASA was actually entertaining this. Five months after her flight, Tereshkova married Vostok 3 cosmonaut Andriyan Nikolayev, and they had a daughter.

Mercury

The US Air Force had been developing a program to launch the first man in space, named Man in Space Soonest. This program studied several different types of one-man space vehicles, settling on a ballistic re-entry capsule launched on a derivative Atlas missile, and selecting a group of nine candidate pilots. After NASA's creation, the program was transferred over to the civilian agency's Space Task Group and renamed Project Mercury on November 26, 1958. The Mercury spacecraft was designed by the STG's chief engineer Maxime Faget. NASA selected a new group of astronaut (from the Greek for "star sailor") candidates from Navy, Air Force and Marine test pilots, and narrowed this down to a group of seven for the program. Capsule design and astronaut training began immediately, working toward preliminary suborbital flights on the Redstone missile, followed by orbital flights on the Atlas. Each flight series would first start unpiloted, then carry a non-human primate, then finally humans.

The Mercury spacecraft's principal designer was Maxime Faget, who started research for human spaceflight during the time of the NACA. It consisted of a conical capsule with a cyllindrical pack of three solid-fuel retro-rockets strapped over a beryllium or fiberglass heat shield on the blunt end. With  of habitable volume, the capsule was just large enough for a single astronaut. On reentry, the astronaut would stay in the craft through splashdown by parachute in the Atlantic Ocean.

On May 5, 1961, Alan Shepard became the first American in space, launching in a ballistic trajectory on Mercury-Redstone 3, in a spacecraft he named Freedom 7. Though he did not achieve orbit like Gagarin, he was the first person to exercise manual control over his spacecraft's attitude and retro-rocket firing. After his successful return, Shepard was celebrated as a national hero, honored with parades in Washington, New York and Los Angeles, and received the NASA Distinguished Service Medal from President John F. Kennedy.

American Virgil "Gus" Grissom repeated Shepard's suborbital flight in Liberty Bell 7 on July 21, 1961. Almost a year after the Soviet Union put a human into orbit, astronaut John Glenn became the first American to orbit the Earth, on February 20, 1962. His Mercury-Atlas 6 mission completed three orbits in the Friendship 7 spacecraft, and splashed down safely in the Atlantic Ocean, after a tense reentry, due to what falsely appeared from the telemetry data to be a loose heat-shield. On February 23, 1962, President Kennedy awarded Glenn with the NASA Distinguished Service Medal in a ceremony at Cape Canaveral Air Force Station. As the first American in orbit, Glenn became a national hero, and received a ticker-tape parade in New York City, reminiscent of that given for Charles Lindbergh.

The United States launched three more Mercury flights after Glenn's: Aurora 7 on May 24, 1962 duplicated Glenn's three orbits, Sigma 7 on October 3, 1962 six orbits, and Faith 7 on May 15, 1963 22 orbits (32.4 hours), the maximum capability of the spacecraft. NASA at first intended to launch one more mission, extending the spacecraft's endurance to three days, but since this would not beat the Soviet record, it was decided instead to concentrate on developing Project Gemini.

Kennedy aims for the Moon

Before Gagarin's flight, US President John F. Kennedy's support for America's piloted space program was lukewarm. Jerome Wiesner of MIT, who served as a science advisor to presidents Eisenhower and Kennedy, and himself an opponent of sending humans into space, remarked, "If Kennedy could have opted out of a big space program without hurting the country in his judgment, he would have." As late as March 1961, when NASA administrator James E. Webb submitted a budget request to fund a Moon landing before 1970, Kennedy rejected it because it was simply too expensive. Some were surprised by Kennedy's eventual support of NASA and the space program because of how often he had attacked the Eisenhower administration's inefficiency during the election.

Gagarin's flight changed this; now Kennedy sensed the humiliation and fear on the part of the American public over the Soviet lead. Additionally, the Bay of Pigs invasion, planned before his term began but executed during it, was an embarrassment to his administration due to the colossal failure of the US forces. Looking for something to save political face, he sent a memo dated April 20, 1961, to Vice President Lyndon B. Johnson, asking him to look into the state of America's space program, and into programs that could offer NASA the opportunity to catch up. The two major options at the time were either the establishment of an Earth orbital space station or a crewed landing on the Moon. Johnson, in turn, consulted with von Braun, who answered Kennedy's questions based on his estimates of US and Soviet rocket lifting capability. Based on this, Johnson responded to Kennedy, concluding that much more was needed to reach a position of leadership, and recommending that the crewed Moon landing was far enough in the future that the US had a fighting chance to achieve it first.

Kennedy ultimately decided to pursue what became the Apollo program, and on May 25 took the opportunity to ask for Congressional support in a Cold War speech titled "Special Message on Urgent National Needs". 
He justified the program in terms of its importance to national security, and its focus of the nation's energies on other scientific and social fields. He rallied popular support for the program in his "We choose to go to the Moon" speech, on September 12, 1962, before a large crowd at Rice University Stadium, in Houston, Texas, near the construction site of the new Lyndon B. Johnson Space Center facility. 

Khrushchev responded to Kennedy's challenge with silence, refusing to publicly confirm or deny the Soviets were pursuing a "Moon race". As later disclosed, the Soviet Union secretly pursued two competing crewed lunar programs. Soviet Decree 655–268, On Work on the Exploration of the Moon and Mastery of Space, issued in August 1964, directed Vladimir Chelomei to develop a Moon flyby program with a projected first flight by the end of 1966, and directed Korolev to develop the Moon landing program with a first flight by the end of 1967. In September 1965, Chelomei's flyby program was assigned to Korolev, who redesigned the cislunar mission to use his own Soyuz 7K-L1 spacecraft and Chelomei's Proton rocket. After Korolev's death in January 1966, another government decree of February 1967 moved the first crewed flyby to mid-1967, and the first crewed landing to the end of 1968.

Proposed joint US-USSR program
After a first US-USSR Dryden-Blagonravov agreement and cooperation on the Echo II balloon satellite in 1962, President Kennedy proposed on September 20, 1963, in a speech before the United Nations General Assembly, that the United States and the Soviet Union join forces in an effort to reach the Moon. Kennedy thus changed his mind regarding the desirability of the space race, preferring instead to ease tensions with the Soviet Union by cooperating on projects such as a joint lunar landing.  Soviet Premier Nikita Khrushchev initially rejected Kennedy's proposal. However, on October 2, 1997, it was reported that Khrushchev's son Sergei claimed Khrushchev was poised to accept Kennedy's proposal at the time of Kennedy's assassination on November 22, 1963. During the next few weeks he reportedly concluded that both nations might realize cost benefits and technological gains from a joint venture, and decided to accept Kennedy's offer based on a measure of rapport during their years as leaders of the world's two superpowers, but changed his mind and dropped the idea since he did not have the same trust for Kennedy's successor, Lyndon Johnson.

Some cooperation in robotic space exploration nevertheless did take place, such as a combined Venera 4–Mariner 5 data analysis under a joint Soviet–American working group of COSPAR in 1969, allowing a more complete drawing of the profile of the atmosphere of Venus. Eventually the Apollo-Soyuz mission was realized afterall, which furthermore laid the foundations for the Shuttle-Mir program and the ISS.

As President, Johnson steadfastly pursued the Gemini and Apollo programs, promoting them as Kennedy's legacy to the American public. One week after Kennedy's death, he issued Executive Order 11129 renaming the Cape Canaveral and Apollo launch facilities after Kennedy.

First crewed spacecraft
Focused by the commitment to a Moon landing, in January 1962 the US announced Project Gemini, a two-person spacecraft that would support the later three-person Apollo by developing the key spaceflight technologies of space rendezvous and docking of two craft, flight durations of sufficient length to go to the Moon and back, and extra-vehicular activity to perform work outside the spacecraft.

Meanwhile, Korolev had planned further long-term missions for the Vostok spacecraft, and had four Vostoks in various stages of fabrication in late 1963 at his OKB-1 facilities. The Americans' announced plans for Gemini represented major advances over the Mercury and Vostok capsules, and Korolev felt the need to try to beat the Americans to many of these innovations. He had already begun designing the Vostok's replacement, the next-generation Soyuz, a multi-cosmonaut spacecraft that had at least the same capabilities as the Gemini spacecraft. Soyuz would not be available for at least three years, and it could not be called upon to deal with this new American challenge in 1964 or 1965. Political pressure in early 1964which some sources claim was from Khrushchev while other sources claim was from other Communist Party officialspushed him to modify his four remaining Vostoks to beat the Americans to new space firsts in the size of flight crews, and the duration of missions.

Voskhod

Korolev's conversion of his surplus Vostok capsules to the Voskhod spacecraft allowed the Soviet space program to beat the Gemini program in achieving the first spaceflight with a multi-person crew, and the first "spacewalk". Gemini took a year longer than planned to make its first flight, so Voskhod 1 became the first spaceflight with a three-person crew on October 12, 1964. The USSR touted another "technological achievement" during this mission: it was the first space flight during which cosmonauts performed in a shirt-sleeve-environment. However, flying without spacesuits was not due to safety improvements in the Soviet spacecraft's environmental systems; rather this was because the craft's limited cabin space did not allow for spacesuits. Flying without spacesuits exposed the cosmonauts to significant risk in the event of potentially fatal cabin depressurization. This was not repeated until the US Apollo Command Module flew in 1968; the command module cabin was designed to transport three astronauts in a low pressure, pure oxygen shirt-sleeve environment while in space.

On March 18, 1965, about a week before the first piloted Project Gemini space flight, the USSR launched the two-cosmonaut Voskhod 2 mission with Pavel Belyayev and Alexei Leonov. Voskhod 2's design modifications included the addition of an inflatable airlock to allow for extravehicular activity (EVA), also known as a spacewalk, while keeping the cabin pressurized so that the capsule's electronics would not overheat. Leonov performed the first-ever EVA as part of the mission. A fatality was narrowly avoided when Leonov's spacesuit expanded in the vacuum of space, preventing him from re-entering the airlock. In order to overcome this, he had to partially depressurize his spacesuit to a potentially dangerous level. He succeeded in safely re-entering the spacecraft, but he and Belyayev faced further challenges when the spacecraft's atmospheric controls flooded the cabin with 45% pure oxygen, which had to be lowered to acceptable levels before re-entry.

By October 16, 1964, Leonid Brezhnev and a small cadre of high-ranking Communist Party officials deposed Khrushchev as Soviet government leader a day after Voskhod 1 landed, in what was called the "Wednesday conspiracy".
The new political leaders, along with Korolev, ended the technologically troublesome Voskhod program, cancelling Voskhod 3 and 4, which were in the planning stages, and started concentrating on reaching the Moon. Voskhod 2 ended up being Korolev's final achievement before his death on January 14, 1966, as it became the last of the space firsts that the USSR achieved during the early 1960s. According to historian Asif Siddiqi, Korolev's accomplishments marked "the absolute zenith of the Soviet space program, one never, ever attained since." There was a two-year pause in Soviet piloted space flights while Voskhod's replacement, the Soyuz spacecraft, was designed and developed.<

Gemini

Though delayed a year to reach its first flight, Gemini was able to take advantage of the USSR's two-year hiatus after Voskhod, which enabled the US to catch up and surpass the previous Soviet superiority in piloted spaceflight. Gemini had ten crewed missions between March 1965 and November 1966: Gemini 3, Gemini 4, Gemini 5, Gemini 6A, Gemini 7, Gemini 8, Gemini 9A, Gemini 10, Gemini 11, and Gemini 12; and accomplished the following:

 Every mission demonstrated the ability to change the craft's orbit.
 Gemini 5 demonstrated eight-day endurance, long enough for a round trip to the Moon. Gemini 7 demonstrated a fourteen-day endurance flight.
Gemini 9A also achieved rendezvous with an Agena Target Vehicle (ATV).
 Rendezvous and docking with the ATV was achieved on Gemini 8, 10, 11, and 12. Gemini 11 achieved the first direct-ascent rendezvous with its Agena target on the first orbit.
Extravehicular activity (EVA) was perfected through increasing practice on Gemini 4, 9A, 10, 11, and 12. On Gemini 12, Edwin "Buzz" Aldrin spent over five hours working comfortably during three (EVA) sessions, finally proving that humans could perform productive tasks outside their spacecraft.
 Gemini 10, 11, and 12 used the ATV's engine to make large changes in its orbit while docked.

Gemini 8 experienced the first in-space mission abort on March 17, 1966, just after achieving the world's first docking, when a stuck or shorted thruster sent the craft into an uncontrolled spin. Command pilot Neil Armstrong was able to shut off the stuck thruster and stop the spin by using the re-entry control system. He and his crewmate David Scott landed and were recovered safely.

Most of the novice pilots on the early missions would command the later missions. In this way, Project Gemini built up spaceflight experience for the pool of astronauts for the Apollo lunar missions. With the completion of Gemini, the US had demonstrated all the technologies necessary to make Kennedy's goal of landing a man on the Moon, with the exception of developing a large enough launch vehicle.

Soviet crewed Moon programs

Korolev's design bureau produced two prospectuses for circumlunar spaceflight (March 1962 and May 1963), the main spacecraft for which were early versions of his Soyuz design. Soviet Communist Party Central Committee Command 655-268 officially established two secret, competing crewed programs for circumlunar flights and lunar landings, on August 3, 1964. The circumlunar flights were planned to occur in 1967, and the landings to start in 1968.

The circumlunar program (Zond), created by Vladimir Chelomey's design bureau OKB-52, was to fly two cosmonauts in a stripped-down Soyuz 7K-L1, launched by Chelomey's Proton UR-500 rocket. The Zond sacrificed habitable cabin volume for equipment, by omitting the Soyuz orbital module. Chelomey gained favor with Khrushchev by employing members of his family.

Korolev's lunar landing program was designated N1/L3, for its N1 super rocket and a more advanced Soyuz 7K-L3 spacecraft, also known as the lunar orbital module ("Lunniy Orbitalny Korabl", LOK), with a crew of two. A separate lunar lander ("Lunniy Korabl", LK), would carry a single cosmonaut to the lunar surface.

The N1/L3 launch vehicle had three stages to Earth orbit, a fourth stage for Earth departure, and a fifth stage for lunar landing assist. The combined space vehicle was roughly the same height and takeoff mass as the three-stage US Apollo-Saturn V and exceeded its takeoff thrust by 28% (45,400 kN vs. 33,000 kN), but had only about half the translunar injection payload capability. The Saturn V used liquid hydrogen fuel in its two upper stages, and carried a  payload to the Moon, enough for a three-person orbiter and two-person lander. The USSR did not use liquid hydrogen until after the N-1 was canceled, therefore it was only capable of a  translunar payload.

Following Khrushchev's ouster from power, Chelomey's Zond program was merged into the N1/L3 program.

Outer space treaty
The US and USSR began discussions on the peaceful uses of space as early as 1958, presenting issues for debate to the United Nations, which created a Committee on the Peaceful Uses of Outer Space in 1959.

On May 10, 1962, Vice President Johnson addressed the Second National Conference on the Peaceful Uses of Space revealing that the United States and the USSR both supported a resolution passed by the Political Committee of the UN General Assembly in December 1962, which not only urged member nations to "extend the rules of international law to outer space," but to also cooperate in its exploration. Following the passing of this resolution, Kennedy commenced his communications proposing a cooperative American and Soviet space program.

The UN ultimately created a Treaty on Principles Governing the Activities of States in the Exploration and Use of Outer Space, including the Moon and Other Celestial Bodies, which was signed by the United States, the USSR, and the United Kingdom on January 27, 1967, and came into force the following October 10.

This treaty:
 bars party States from placing weapons of mass destruction in Earth orbit, on the Moon, or any other celestial body;
 exclusively limits the use of the Moon and other celestial bodies to peaceful purposes, and expressly prohibits their use for testing weapons of any kind, conducting military maneuvers, or establishing military bases, installations, and fortifications;
 declares that the exploration of outer space shall be done to benefit all countries and shall be free for exploration and use by all the States;
 explicitly forbids any government from claiming a celestial resource such as the Moon or a planet, claiming that they are the common heritage of mankind, "not subject to national appropriation by claim of sovereignty, by means of use or occupation, or by any other means". However, the State that launches a space object retains jurisdiction and control over that object;
 holds any State liable for damages caused by their space object;
 declares that "the activities of non-governmental entities in outer space, including the Moon and other celestial bodies, shall require authorization and continuing supervision by the appropriate State Party to the Treaty", and "States Parties shall bear international responsibility for national space activities whether carried out by governmental or non-governmental entities"; and
 "A State Party to the Treaty which has reason to believe that an activity or experiment planned by another State Party in outer space, including the Moon and other celestial bodies, would cause potentially harmful interference with activities in the peaceful exploration and use of outer space, including the Moon and other celestial bodies, may request consultation concerning the activity or experiment."

The treaty remains in force, signed by 107 member states. –

Disaster strikes both sides
In 1967, both nations' space programs faced serious challenges that brought them to temporary halts.

Apollo 1

On January 27, 1967, the same day the US and USSR signed the Outer Space Treaty, the crew of the first crewed Apollo mission, Command Pilot Virgil "Gus" Grissom, Senior Pilot Ed White, and Pilot Roger Chaffee, were killed in a fire that swept through their spacecraft cabin during a ground test, less than a month before the planned February 21 launch. An investigative board determined the fire was probably caused by an electrical spark and quickly grew out of control, fed by the spacecraft's atmosphere of pure oxygen at greater than one standard atmosphere. Crew escape was made impossible by inability to open the plug door hatch cover against the internal pressure. The board also found design and construction flaws in the spacecraft, and procedural failings, including failure to appreciate the hazard of the pure-oxygen atmosphere, as well as inadequate safety procedures. All these flaws had to be corrected over the next twenty-two months until the first piloted flight could be made.
Mercury and Gemini veteran Grissom had been a favored choice of Deke Slayton, NASA's Director of Flight Crew Operations, to make the first piloted landing.

Soyuz 1

On April 24, 1967, the single pilot of Soyuz 1, Vladimir Komarov, became the first in-flight spaceflight fatality. The mission was planned to be a three-day test, to include the first Soviet docking with an unpiloted Soyuz 2, but the mission was plagued with problems. Early on, Komarov's craft lacked sufficient electrical power because only one of two solar panels had deployed. Then the automatic attitude control system began malfunctioning and eventually failed completely, resulting in the craft spinning wildly. Komarov was able to stop the spin with the manual system, which was only partially effective. The flight controllers aborted his mission after only one day. During the emergency re-entry, a fault in the landing parachute system caused the primary chute to fail, and the reserve chute became tangled with the drogue chute, causing descent speed to reach as high as 40 m/s (140 km/h; 89 mph). Shortly thereafter, Soyuz 1 impacted the ground 3 km (1.9 mi) west of Karabutak, exploding into a ball of flames. The official autopsy states Komarov died of blunt force trauma on impact, and that the subsequent heat mutilation of his corpse was a result of the explosive impact. Fixing the spacecraft's faults caused an eighteen-month delay before piloted Soyuz flights could resume.

Both programs recover
The United States recovered from the Apollo 1 fire, fixing the fatal flaws in an improved version of the Block II command module. The US proceeded with unpiloted test launches of the Saturn V launch vehicle (Apollo 4 and Apollo 6) and the Lunar Module (Apollo 5) during the latter half of 1967 and early 1968. The first Saturn V flight was an unqualified success, and although the second suffered some non-catastrophic engine failures, it was considered a partial success and the launcher achieved human rating qualification. Apollo 1's mission to check out the Apollo Command and Service Module in Earth orbit was accomplished by Grissom's backup crew on Apollo 7, launched on October 11, 1968. The eleven-day mission was a total success, as the spacecraft performed a virtually flawless mission, paving the way for the United States to continue with its lunar mission schedule.

The Soviet Union also fixed the parachute and control problems with Soyuz, and the next piloted mission Soyuz 3 was launched on October 26, 1968. The goal was to complete Komarov's rendezvous and docking mission with the un-piloted Soyuz 2. Ground controllers brought the two craft to within  of each other, then cosmonaut Georgy Beregovoy took control. He got within  of his target, but was unable to dock before expending 90 percent of his maneuvering fuel, due to a piloting error that put his spacecraft into the wrong orientation and forced Soyuz 2 to automatically turn away from his approaching craft. The first docking of Soviet spacecraft was finally realized in January 1969 by the Soyuz 4 and Soyuz 5 missions. It was the first-ever docking of two crewed spacecraft, and the first transfer of crew from one space vehicle to another.

The Soviet Zond spacecraft was not yet ready for piloted circumlunar missions in 1968, after six unsuccessful automated test launches: Kosmos 146 on March 10, 1967; Kosmos 154 on April 8, 1967; Zond 1967A on September 28, 1967; Zond 1967B on November 22, 1967; Zond 1968A on April 23, 1968; and Zond 1968B in July 1968. Zond 4 was launched on March 2, 1968, and successfully made a circumlunar flight, but encountered problems with its Earth reentry on March 9, and was ordered destroyed by an explosive charge  over the Gulf of Guinea. The Soviet official announcement said that Zond 4 was an automated test flight which ended with its intentional destruction, due to its recovery trajectory positioning it over the Atlantic Ocean instead of over the USSR.

During the summer of 1968, the Apollo program hit another snag: the first pilot-rated Lunar Module (LM) was not ready for orbital tests in time for a December 1968 launch. NASA planners overcame this challenge by changing the mission flight order, delaying the first LM flight until March 1969, and sending Apollo 8 into lunar orbit without the LM in December. This mission was in part motivated by intelligence rumors the Soviet Union might be ready for a piloted Zond flight during late 1968. In September 1968, Zond 5 made a circumlunar flight with tortoises on board and returned safely to Earth, accomplishing the first successful water landing of the Soviet space program in the Indian Ocean. It also scared NASA planners, as it took them several days to figure out that it was only an automated flight, not piloted, because voice recordings were transmitted from the craft en route to the Moon. On November 10, 1968, another automated test flight, Zond 6, was launched. It encountered difficulties in Earth reentry, and depressurized and deployed its parachute too early, causing it to crash-land only  from where it had been launched six days earlier. It turned out there was no chance of a piloted Soviet circumlunar flight during 1968, due to the unreliability of the Zonds.

On December 21, 1968, Frank Borman, James Lovell, and William Anders became the first humans to ride the Saturn V rocket into space, on Apollo 8. They also became the first to leave low-Earth orbit and go to another celestial body, entering lunar orbit on December 24. They made ten orbits in twenty hours, and transmitted one of the most watched TV broadcasts in history, with their Christmas Eve program from lunar orbit, which concluded with a reading from the biblical Book of Genesis. Two and a half hours after the broadcast, they fired their engine to perform the first trans-Earth injection to leave lunar orbit and return to the Earth. Apollo 8 safely landed in the Pacific Ocean on December 27, in NASA's first dawn splashdown and recovery.

The American Lunar Module was finally ready for a successful piloted test flight in low Earth orbit on Apollo 9 in March 1969. With the LM proven to work well, the next step was to attempt the landing.

Unknown to the Americans, the Soviet Moon program was in deep trouble. After two successive launch failures of the N1 rocket in 1969, Soviet plans for a piloted landing suffered delay. The launch pad explosion of the N-1 on July 3, 1969, was a significant setback. The rocket hit the pad after an engine shutdown, destroying itself and the launch facility. Without the N-1 rocket, the USSR could not send a large enough payload to the Moon to land a human and return him safely.

First humans on the Moon

Apollo 11 was prepared with the goal of a July landing in the Sea of Tranquility. The crew, selected in January 1969, consisted of commander (CDR) Neil Armstrong, Command Module Pilot (CMP) Michael Collins, and Lunar Module Pilot (LMP) Edwin "Buzz" Aldrin. They trained for the mission until just before the launch day. On July 16, 1969, at 9:32 am EDT, the Saturn V rocket, AS-506, lifted off from Kennedy Space Center Launch Complex 39 in Florida.

The trip to the Moon took just over three days. After achieving orbit, Armstrong and Aldrin transferred into the Lunar Module named Eagle, leaving Collins in the Command and Service Module Columbia, and began their descent. Six hours later, at 02:56 UTC, July 21 (9:56 pm CDT July 20), Armstrong left the Eagle to become the first human to set foot on the Moon.

The first step was witnessed on live television by at least one-fifth of the population of Earth, or about 723 million people. His first words when he stepped off the LM's landing footpad were, "That's one small step for [a] man, one giant leap for mankind." Aldrin joined him on the surface almost 20 minutes later. Altogether, they spent just under two and one-quarter hours outside their craft. The next day, they performed the first launch from another celestial body, and rendezvoused back with Collins in Columbia.

Apollo 11 left lunar orbit and returned to Earth, landing safely in the Pacific Ocean on July 24, 1969. When the spacecraft splashed down, 2,982 days had passed since Kennedy's commitment to landing a man on the Moon and returning him safely to the Earth before the end of the decade; the mission was completed with 161 days to spare. With the safe completion of the Apollo 11 mission, the Americans won the race to the Moon.

Armstrong and his crew became worldwide celebrities, feted with ticker-tape parades on August 13 in New York City and Chicago, attended by an estimated six million. That evening in Los Angeles they were honored at an official state dinner attended by members of Congress, 44 governors, the Chief Justice of the United States, and ambassadors from 83 nations. The President and Vice president presented each astronaut with the Presidential Medal of Freedom. The astronauts spoke before a joint session of Congress on September 16, 1969. This began a 38-day world tour to 22 foreign countries and included visits with the leaders of many countries.

The public's reaction in the Soviet Union was mixed. The Soviet government limited the release of information about the lunar landing, which affected the reaction. A portion of the populace did not give it any attention, and another portion was angered by it.

The first landing was followed by another, precision landing on Apollo 12 in November 1969, within walking distance of the Surveyor 3 spacecraft which landed on April 20, 1967.

Competition ramps down

NASA had ambitious follow-on human spaceflight plans as it reached its lunar goal, but soon discovered it had expended most of its political capital to do so. A victim of its own success, Apollo had achieved its first landing goal with enough spacecraft and Saturn V launchers left for a total of ten lunar landings through Apollo 20, conducting extended-duration missions and transporting the landing crews in Lunar Roving Vehicles on the last five. NASA also planned an Apollo Applications Program (AAP) to develop a longer-duration Earth orbital workshop (later named Skylab) from a spent S-IVB upper stage, to be constructed in orbit using several launches of the smaller Saturn IB launch vehicle.

In February 1969, President Richard M. Nixon convened a "space task group" to set recommendations for the future US civilian space program, headed by his Vice President Spiro T. Agnew. Agnew was an enthusiastic proponent of NASA's follow-on plans for permanent space stations in Earth and lunar orbit, perhaps a base on the lunar surface, and the first human flight to Mars as early as 1986 or as late as 2000. These would be serviced by an infrastructure of a reusable Space Transportation System  including an Earth-to-orbit Space Shuttle. Nixon had a better sense of the declining political support in Congress for new Apollo-style programs, which had disappeared with the achievement of the landing, and he intended to pursue détente with the USSR and China, which he hoped might ease Cold War tensions. He cut the spending proposal he sent to Congress to include funding for only the Space Shuttle, with perhaps an option to pursue the Earth orbital space station for the foreseeable future.

AAP planners decided the Earth orbital workshop could be accomplished more efficiently by pre-fabricating it on the ground and launching it with a single Saturn V, which immediately eliminated Apollo 20. Budget cuts soon led NASA to cut Apollo 18 and 19 as well. Apollo 13 had to abort its lunar landing in April 1970 due to an in-flight spacecraft failure, but returned its crew safely to Earth. The Apollo program made its final lunar landing in December 1972; the two unused Saturn Vs were used as outdoor visitor displays and allowed to deteriorate due to the effects of weathering.

The USSR continued trying to develop their N1 rocket, after two more launch failures in 1971 and 1972, finally canceling it in May 1974, without achieving a single successful uncrewed test flight.

Salyuts and Skylab

Having lost the race to the Moon, the USSR decided to concentrate on orbital space stations. During 1969 and 1970, they launched six more Soyuz flights after Soyuz 3, then launched a series of six successful space stations (plus two failures to achieve orbit, and one station rendered uninhabitable due to damage from explosion of the launcher's upper stage) on their Proton-K heavy-lift launcher in their Salyut program designed by Kerim Kerimov. All of the Salyuts were presented to the public as non-military scientific laboratories, but three of them were covers for military Almaz reconnaissance stations: Salyut 2 (failed), Salyut 3, and Salyut 5.

Salyut 1, the first space station, was launched by the Soviets on April 19, 1971. Three days later, the Soyuz 10 crew attempted to dock with it, but failed to achieve a secure enough connection to safely enter the station. The Soyuz 11 crew of Vladislav Volkov, Georgi Dobrovolski and Viktor Patsayev successfully docked on June 7, and completed a record 22-day stay. The crew became the second in-flight space fatality during their reentry on June 30. They were asphyxiated when their spacecraft's cabin lost all pressure, shortly after undocking. The disaster was blamed on a faulty cabin pressure valve, that allowed all the air to vent into space. The crew was not wearing pressure suits and had no chance of survival once the leak occurred.

The United States launched a single orbital workstation Skylab on May 14, 1973. Skylab was damaged during the ascent to orbit, losing one of its solar panels and a meteoroid thermal shield. Subsequent crewed missions repaired the station, and the third and final mission's crew, Skylab 4, set a human endurance record (at the time) with 84 days in orbit when the mission ended on February 8, 1974. Skylab stayed in orbit another five years before reentering the Earth's atmosphere over the Indian Ocean and Western Australia on July 11, 1979.

Salyut 4 broke Skylabs occupation record at 92 days. Salyut 6 and Salyut 7 were second-generation stations designed for long duration, and were occupied for 683 and 816 days.

Apollo–Soyuz Test Project

In May 1972, President Richard M. Nixon and Soviet Premier Leonid Brezhnev negotiated an easing of relations known as détente, creating a temporary "thaw" in the Cold War. The two nations planned a joint mission to dock the last US Apollo craft with a Soyuz, known as the Apollo-Soyuz Test Project (ASTP). To prepare, the US designed a docking module for the Apollo that was compatible with the Soviet docking system, which allowed any of their craft to dock with any other (e.g. Soyuz-to-Soyuz as well as Soyuz-to-Salyut). The module was also necessary as an airlock to allow the men to visit each other's craft, which had incompatible cabin atmospheres. The USSR used the Soyuz 16 mission in December 1974 to test modifications of the Soyuz atmosphere and the docking adapter to prepare for ASTP.

The joint mission began when Soyuz 19 was first launched on July 15, 1975, at 12:20 UTC, and the Apollo craft was launched with the docking module six and a half hours later. The two craft rendezvoused and docked on July 17 at 16:19 UTC. The three astronauts conducted joint experiments with the two cosmonauts, and the crew shook hands, exchanged gifts, and visited each other's craft.

Space Shuttles

NASA achieved the first approach and landing test of its Space Shuttle orbiter on a Boeing 747 carrier plane on August 12, 1977, and the first orbital test flight of a complete, crewed Space Shuttle, consisting of the orbiter, an external fuel tank, and two solid rocket boosters, on April 12, 1981. The designers underestimated the time and cost of refurbishment between flights, which reduced the cost benefit of its reusability. They also overestimated its safety: two of the fleet of five orbiters were lost in fatal flight accidents: one during launch, due to failure of a solid rocket booster seal; and one on reentry, due to launch damage of a wing heat shield. The Air Force was also supposed to use the Shuttle to launch its military payloads, but shunned it in favor of its expendable launchers after the first Shuttle loss. NASA ceased production of its Apollo spacecraft and Saturn IB launcher, and used the Shuttle as its orbital workhorse until 2011, then retired it due to the safety concern. Originally, more than 150 flights over a 15-year operation were expected; actually, the Shuttle made 135 flights in its 30-year lifespan.

The Soviets mistook the Shuttle as a military surveillance vehicle, and decided they had to develop their own shuttle which they named Buran, beginning in 1974. They copied the aerodynamic design of NASA's Shuttle orbiter, which they strapped to the side of their expendable, liquid hydrogen-fueled Energia launcher. The Buran could be fitted with four Saturn AL-31 turbofan engines and a fuel tank in its payload bay, allowing it to make its own atmospheric test flights, which began in November 1985. Also unlike the US Shuttle, it could be flown pilotlessly and landed automatically. Energia-Buran made only one orbital test flight in November 1988, but US counterintelligence baited the Soviets with disinformation about the heat shield design, and it was not reusable for repeated flight. Buran was the largest and most expensive Soviet program in the history of the Space Race, and was effectively canceled by the collapse of the Soviet Union in 1991, due to lack of funding. The Energia was also canceled at the same time, after only two flights.

First professional women in space
The first woman in space was from the Soviet Union, Valentina Tereshkova. NASA did not welcome women astronauts into its corps until 1978, when six female mission specialists were recruited. This first class included scientist Sally Ride, who became America's first woman in space on STS-7 in June 1983. NASA included women mission specialists in the next four astronaut candidate classes, and admitted female pilots starting in 1990. Eileen Collins from this class became the first pilot to fly on Space Shuttle flight STS-63 in February 1995, and the first female commander of a spaceflight on STS-93 in July 1999.

The USSR admitted its first female test pilot as a cosmonaut, Svetlana Savitskaya, in 1980. She became the first female to fly since Tereshkova, on Salyut 7 in December 1981.

First modular space station

The USSR turned its space program to development of the low Earth orbit modular space station Mir (peace or world) assembled in orbit from 1986 to 1996. At , it held records for the largest spacecraft and the longest continuous human presence in space at 3,644 days, until the International Space Station was built starting in 1998. Mirs operation continued after the 1991 replacement of the USSR's space program with the Russian Federal Space Agency until 2001, supported by Soyuz spacecraft.

Legacy

After the end of the Cold War in 1991, the assets of the USSR's space program passed mainly to Russia. Since then, the United States and Russia have cooperated in space with the Shuttle-Mir Program, and the International Space Station (ISS).

The Russians continue to use their R-7 rocket family as their orbital workhorse to launch the Soyuz crewed spacecraft and its  Progress derivative uncrewed cargo craft as shuttles to the ISS. After the 2011 retirement of the Space Shuttle, American crews were dependent on the R-7–Soyuz to reach the ISS, until the 2020 first flight of the US Crew Dragon Commercial Crew Development vehicle.

See also

 Billionaire space race
 Cold War
 Arms race
 Cold War playground equipment
 History of spaceflight
 List of space exploration milestones, 1957–1969
 Moon Landing
 Moon Shot
 Space advocacy
 Space exploration
 Space policy
 Space propaganda
 Spaceflight records
 SEDS
 Timeline of Solar System exploration
 Timeline of space exploration
 Woods Hole Conference
 Mars race

References

References
 

 
 
 
 
 
 
 
 
 
 
 
 
 
 
 
 
 
 
 
 
 Pekkanen, Saadia M. "Governing the New Space Race." AJIL Unbound 113 (2019): 92–97. online, role of international law.

External links

 Scanned letter from Wernher Von Braun to Vice President Johnson
 "America's Space Program: Exploring a New Frontier", a National Park Service Teaching with Historic Places (TwHP) lesson plan
 Why Did the USSR Lose the Moon Race? from Pravda, 2002-12-03
 Space Race Exhibition  at the Smithsonian National Air and Space Museum
 TheSpaceRace.com – Mercury, Gemini, and Apollo space programs
 Timeline of the Space Race to the Moon 1960 – 1969
 Shadows of the Soviet Space Age, Paul Lucas
 Chronology:Moon Race at russianspaceweb.com
 

Cold War
History of science and technology in the United States
Science and technology in the Soviet Union
Soviet Union–United States relations
Presidency of John F. Kennedy
Space policy
Presidency of Lyndon B. Johnson
Presidency of Dwight D. Eisenhower
Presidency of Richard Nixon
Presidency of Gerald Ford
Geopolitical rivalry
Technological races
Operation Paperclip
Space exploration
Spaceflight histories